Aphomia spoliatrix is a species of snout moth in the genus Aphomia. It was described by Hugo Theodor Christoph in 1881 and is known from south-eastern Siberia.

References

Moths described in 1881
Tirathabini
Moths of Asia